Vaejovis janssi is a species of scorpion endemic to the Revillagigedo Islands in Mexico.

References

Further reading
 Williams, 1980 : Scorpions of Baja California, Mexico, and adjacent islands. Occasional Papers California Academy of Sciences, n. 135, pp. 1–127.

External links
 Classification of Hallan

Vaejovidae
Endemic scorpions of Mexico
Fauna of Western Mexico
Natural history of the Revillagigedo Islands
Animals described in 1980